Elbow Lake is a lake in the Canadian province of Saskatchewan. It is located in the east-central part of the province at the terminus of Midnight Creek in the Porcupine Hills and Porcupine Provincial Forest. The lake is in the Woody River Block of Porcupine Hills Provincial Park and is situated in boreal forest surrounded by hills, other small lakes, and muskeg. The small community of Elbow Lake is located at the north-west corner and Highway 980 provides access to it and the lake.

Description 
Prior to the formation of Porcupine Hills Provincial Park in 2018, the parkland around Elbow Lake was a provincial recreation site called Woody River Recreation Site. Immediately to the west of the lake is Stark Lake which is connected by at short stream. The Elbow Lake's primary inflow, Midnight Creek, enters the lake at the north-west corner beside the community of Elbow Lake. A stream from Spirit Lake enters along the northern shore and at the southern end of the lake, a short river flows out and into Woody Lake, which is the source of the Woody River.

Fish species 
Fish commonly found in the lake include walleye, perch, and northern pike.

See also 
List of lakes of Saskatchewan
Tourism in Saskatchewan
Hudson Bay drainage basin

References 

Lakes of Saskatchewan
Hudson Bay No. 394, Saskatchewan